Liao Lisheng (born 29 April 1993) is a Chinese professional footballer who currently plays as a midfielder for Chinese Super League club Shandong Taishan.

Club career

Early life
Liao Lisheng was born in Longgang, Shenzhen to a Teochew family that originated from Jiexi. He started his football career when he received organized football training at age nine at the Guangxi Hercules Football School. He later trained with Zhaoqing Sunray Cave Football School, Gu Guangming Football School, and Shenzhen Kingway's youth academy between 2005 and 2008 and eventually joined Dongguan Nancheng's youth academy in 2008.

Dongguan Nancheng
Liao was promoted to Dongguan Nancheng's first team in the 2011 season. Liao scored three goals in 19 appearances in the group stage as Dongguan finished the fourth place in the south group and entered the playoff stage. Liao played in all five matches in the playoffs; however, Dongguan lost to Chongqing F.C. 3-0 on aggregate in the semifinals which meant they failed to be promoted to China League One directly, and then lost to Fujian Smart Hero 2-0 in the third place playoff and failed to enter to the relegation playoff.

Liao was then promoted to captain during the 2012 season. Although Dongguan was deemed as one of the hottest clubs for promotion in this season, they were knocked out by just finished the sixth place in the group stage. Liao played 23 league matches and scored four goals in the 2012 season. Liao scored the winning goal on 2 June 2012  in a 1-0 win against Tianjin Songjiang in the second round of the 2012 Chinese FA Cup, meaning Dongguan became the first third-tier club to reach the third round of FA Cup. They finally ended their FA Cup journey in the third round on 27 June 2012 in a 4-0 loss against Shandong Luneng.

Guangzhou Evergrande
After Dongguan Nancheng failed to be promoted to the second tier, Liao transferred to Chinese Super League giant Guangzhou Evergrande along with his teammates Fang Jingqi, Yang Chaosheng, Li Weixin, Hu Weiwei, Zhang Xingbo and Wang Rui in November 2012. He made his debut for the club on 30 October 2013 in a 1-1 draw against Shanghai East Asia. On 26 February 2014, he was substituted on for Muriqui at half time when Guangzhou was losing 2-0 against Melbourne Victory in the first match of 2014 AFC Champions League. He provided a crucial assist to Elkeson who scored and put Guangzhou 3-2 ahead, eventually winning the match 4-2. On 18 March 2014, he scored his first goal for the club in the third group match of 2014 AFC Champions League which ensured a 3-1 win against Jeonbuk Hyundai Motors. He played 28 matches for the club across all competitions in the 2014 season and was named as a candidate for Chinese Football Association Young Player of the Year award; however, he lost out to Liu Binbin who instead picked up the honour.

On 18 March 2015, Liao suffered a fifth metatarsal bone fracture in a 2015 AFC Champions League match against Kashima Antlers and received surgery in Italy later that month. He recovered from injury by August 2015 but didn't play for Guangzhou for the rest of the 2015 season. He made his return on 24 April 2016, 403 days after his injury, in a 4-0 away win against Tianjin Teda, coming on as a substitute for Alan Carvalho in the 85th minute. He scored his first goal in the Super League on 30 October 2016 in a 4-0 home victory against Shandong Luneng. In December 2016, Liao extended his contract with Guangzhou until the end of the 2021 season.

On 22 February 2017, Liao scored twice in Guangzhou's season opener, a 7-0 home win against Eastern in the 2017 AFC Champions League. On 2 May 2017, he scored the opening goal and assisted Gao Lin in a 2-1 win against Meixian Techand in the third round of the 2017 Chinese FA Cup.

On 7 February 2019, Liao was loaned to fellow top tier club Tianjin Tianhai for the 2019 season.

Shandong Taishan
On 22 March 2022, Liao joined fellow top tier Chinese football club Shandong Taishan for the start of the 2022 Chinese Super League campaign. He made his debut for the club on 3 June 2022 in a league game against Zhejiang Professional that ended in a 1-0 victory. This would be followed by his first goal for the club, which was scored in a league game on 10 July 2022 against Dalian Professional in a 3-1 victory. He would establish himself as a regular member of the teams midfield that went on to the win the 2022 Chinese FA Cup with them.

International career
Liao made his debut for the Chinese national team on 18 June 2014 in a 2-0 win against Macedonia. He was called up to China's final squad for the 2015 AFC Asian Cup but didn't appear in any matches during the tournament. Liao was named in the China national team's squad in November 2017 for the 2017 EAFF E-1 Football Championship by Marcello Lippi in place of injured Jiang Zhipeng. He left in advance without playing during the tournament for the birth of his child.

Career statistics

Club statistics
.

International statistics

Honours

Club 
Guangzhou Evergrande
Chinese Super League: 2013, 2014, 2015, 2016, 2017
AFC Champions League: 2013, 2015
Chinese FA Cup: 2016
Chinese FA Super Cup: 2016, 2017

Shandong Taishan
Chinese FA Cup: 2022.

References

External links
 
 

Living people
1993 births
Association football midfielders
Chinese footballers
Sportspeople from Shenzhen
Footballers from Jieyang
Guangzhou F.C. players
Tianjin Tianhai F.C. players
People from Jiexi
Chinese Super League players
China League Two players
China international footballers
2015 AFC Asian Cup players
Footballers at the 2014 Asian Games
Asian Games competitors for China